Doom is a 2016 first-person shooter game developed by id Software and published by Bethesda Softworks. It is the first major installment in the Doom series since 2004's Doom 3. Players take the role of an unnamed space marine, known as the "Doom Slayer", as he battles demonic forces from Hell that have been unleashed by the Union Aerospace Corporation within their energy-mining facility on Mars. The gameplay returns to a faster pace with more open-ended levels, closer to the first two games than the slower survival horror approach of Doom 3. It also features environment traversal, character upgrades, and the ability to perform executions known as "glory kills".

Doom was announced as Doom 4 in 2008, and that version underwent an extensive development cycle with different builds and designs before the game was restarted in 2011 and revealed as simply Doom in 2014. It was tested by customers who pre-ordered the 2014 Bethesda game Wolfenstein: The New Order and also by the general public. Mick Gordon composed the music for the game, with additional music contributed by Ben F. Carney, Chris Hite, and Chad Mossholder. The game also supports an online multiplayer component and a level editor known as "SnapMap", co-developed with Certain Affinity and Escalation Studios respectively. It was released worldwide on PlayStation 4, Windows, and Xbox One in May 2016. A port for Nintendo Switch was co-developed with Panic Button and released in November 2017, and a version for Google Stadia was released in August 2020.

Doom was well-received by critics and players. The single-player campaign, graphics, soundtrack, and gameplay received considerable praise, with reviewers crediting the game for recapturing the spirit of the classic Doom games and first-person shooters of the 1990s, whereas the multiplayer mode drew the most significant criticism. It was the second best-selling video game in North America and the UK a few weeks after its release and sold over 500,000 copies for PCs within the same time period. A sequel titled Doom Eternal was released in March 2020.

Gameplay

Single-player

According to the game's executive producer Marty Stratton, the key principles of Dooms single-player mode are "badass demons, big effing guns, and moving really fast". The game allows players to perform movements such as double jumps and ledge climbs throughout levels of industrial and corporate fields of a Union Aerospace Corporation (UAC) research facility on Mars and then levels of Hell, as the combat system puts emphasis upon momentum and speed. The approach is known as "push-forward combat", which discourages players from taking cover behind obstacles or resting to regain health while playing from the Doom Slayer's perspective. Players instead collect health and armor pick-ups by killing enemies. "Glory kills" is a newly-introduced melee execution system; when enough damage has been dealt to an enemy, the game will highlight it and allow the player to perform a quick and violent melee takedown, rewarding the player with small health recovery.

Fights also require the player to develop simple tactics. As the game gets harder, the player needs to better utilize the advantages of fight arenas and bonuses. They also need to decide which enemies should be prioritized and how to move around on the battlefield.

The game features a large arsenal of weapons which can be collected and freely switched by players throughout the game and require no reloading. Recurring weapons of the series also make a return, including the super shotgun and BFG 9000. The BFG has a very small ammunition capacity, but is extremely powerful. Similarly, the chainsaw returns, but has been reintroduced as a special-use weapon that relies upon fuel, but can be used to instantly cut through enemies and provide a greater-than-normal drop of ammunition for the player.

Many enemies also return from the original game, such as the Revenant, Demon (or Pinky), Mancubus, and Cyberdemon, with many also redesigned. Dooms campaign was made to be at least 13 hours long, and the "Ultra-Nightmare" difficulty level features permadeath, which causes the savegame to be lost once the player dies. The campaign also features 13 levels.

Many of the levels have multiple pathways and open areas, which allow players to explore and find collectibles and secrets throughout the levels. Many of these collectibles can be used as part of Dooms progression system, including weapon mods, rune powers, and Praetor Suit upgrades. Weapon mods come from field drones and allow the player to unlock alternate modes of fire for many weapons, such as explosive shots and different rate and output of firepower. Each of the weapons' firing modes can be further upgraded using weapon tokens, but they can only be maxed out by completing a challenge related to that particular firing mode. Runes transport the player to a separate arena to perform a combat challenge that grants different abilities when successfully completed, such as better equipment drops from fallen enemies. Players can also upgrade their "Praetor Suit" by retrieving special tokens from dead marines and using them to improve functionality such as equipment, navigation and resistances. Other pickups include small Doomguy figurines that allow the player to view 3D models of different characters, and data files that expand on the characters and story.

Additionally, each of the game's levels contains a hidden lever which opens an area extracted from a classic level in the original Doom or Doom II. Finding each of these areas unlocks them, making them accessible from the game's main menu in a section called Classic Maps.

Multiplayer
In Dooms multiplayer mode, several modes, such as team deathmatch and its variation "Soul Harvest", as well as Freeze Tag, Warpath (King of the Hill with a moving 'hill'), Domination, and "Clan Arena" (team last man standing with no pickups), exist within the game. Players can also use power-ups and teleporters in a multiplayer match. They can pick up a Demon Rune, one of the power-ups featured, to transform into and fight as a demon. There are four demons available initially in the game, each of which has different abilities: the Revenant, the Baron of Hell, the Mancubus, and the Prowler. At launch, the game featured nine maps.

Players are granted experience points upon each match. After they have collected sufficient experience points, players can level up, by which new armor, skins, weapons, and power-ups would be unlocked for players to use. Both the player character and weapon can be customized extensively by applying new skins and colors onto them. In addition, players can receive hack modules while playing the game, which are special abilities that can only be used once after they are collected. There are over six types of modules. Scout reveals the locations of all enemies to the player for a limited time after respawning, while Vital Signs shows all enemies' health. Retribution allows players to track their last killer by revealing that player's health and location, while Power Seeker guides players to the power weapon pickup in the game. The Resupply Timer, meanwhile, shows the respawn time of the power-up items. Players can also perform taunts in the game's multiplayer.

On July 19, 2017, Update 6.66 was released for Doom's multiplayer. Update 6.66 features a revised progression system, all three DLC bundled into the core game, a new 'rune' system (replacing the Hack Module system) and enhanced kill notifications. To accommodate this new progression system, Update 6.66 also reset all players' multiplayer experience progression, but not without giving players the option whether to retain all unlocked items or reset them. Players who played before Update 6.66 and players who obtained the 'Slayer' level received unique medals to show their status.

Level creation tool
In all of its platforms except the Nintendo Switch, Doom includes a built-in level creation tool called "SnapMap" which allows players to create and edit maps with their own structure and game logic. With SnapMap, players can create maps for different modes, ranging from single-player levels to co-operative or competitive multiplayer maps. When players are building a level, the game will shift to a top-down view. Players can place rooms and hallways to form a level and connect them together. If they are not connected together, the color of the construction pieces changes to notify the player. Players can also use the X-ray camera which temporarily removes all the walls to allow players to view the objects inside. Players can also place enemies into their maps, with the exception of the campaign's bosses. Their artificial intelligence and stats, and the player's own movement speed can also be modified. Players can also add additional particle effects, lighting effects, and other gameplay items, such as health packs and ammo pick-ups. Only in-game assets can be used, and players cannot create or import their own models into the game. Levels can be tested before they are published online.

For players who do not wish to create extensively, the game features an AI conductor which automatically generates enemies. Players receive "snap points" after they create a level or play a level created by other users. These points can be used to unlock additional cosmetic items. Players can share their completed maps with other players. They can vote on and even modify other players' content and share them while citing the originals' authors.

Plot
Doom takes place during the year 2149 in a research facility located in the Hellas Planitia on Mars owned by the Union Aerospace Corporation. The facility is run by Dr. Samuel Hayden, a UAC scientist whose mind now inhabits an android body after having lost his original to brain cancer. Researchers at the UAC facility have attempted to draw energy from Hell, a newly discovered alternative dimension inhabited by demons, in order to solve an energy crisis on Earth. They accomplish this using the Argent Tower, a structure which siphons "Argent Energy" from Hell and allows travel to and from the other side. In addition to their energy harvesting work, Hayden organizes several expeditions into Hell, bringing back captive demons and artifacts for study. Among them is a sarcophagus containing the Doom Slayer (along with his armor, the Praetor Suit).

The facility is overrun by demons after one of Hayden's researchers, Olivia Pierce, makes a pact with them and plots to use the Tower to open a portal to Hell. In desperation, Hayden releases the Doom Slayer from his sarcophagus to repel the demonic invasion and close the portal. The Doom Slayer recovers his Praetor Suit and fights his way through the overrun facility, guided by the self-aware AI VEGA, which controls the facility. After clearing out the facility core and preventing a meltdown, he pursues Pierce and destroys the energy induction filters, despite Hayden's objections. He tracks Pierce up the tower, where she uses an Argent accumulator to open an explosive rift into Hell, destroying the Tower and sending the Slayer back to Hell.

Fighting his way to a teleporter, the Doom Slayer returns to Mars and makes his way to a tram leading to Hayden. Hayden informs the Slayer of the Helix Stone, an artifact used to study and harness Hell's Argent Energy. Entering Pierce's Lazarus Labs, he observes the Helix Stone and he learns of the Well, where the portal is powered, and of the Crucible, a magical key-like blade. He makes another excursion into Hell by activating the accumulator of a contained Cyberdemon that he defeats and fights through a labyrinthine gauntlet to recover the Crucible from a trio of Hell Guards. Arriving at VEGA's facility in the frozen north, he makes a backup copy of the AI and destroys the facility. The explosion of VEGA's core allows the Slayer to enter the Well, where he uses the Crucible to destroy the portal's power source. Finally, he confronts Pierce, who is betrayed and transformed by the demons into the monstrous Spider Mastermind. She attempts to kill the Slayer but is eventually defeated.

Upon the Doom Slayer's return to Mars, Hayden confiscates the Crucible, which he plans to use in his research. Despite all that has happened, he insists that Earth is too desperate for energy to give up. To keep the Doom Slayer from interfering with his plans, Hayden teleports him to an undisclosed location, saying that they will meet again.

Development

As Doom 4

John Carmack, co-founder of and then lead developer at id Software, indicated that Doom 4 was in development at QuakeCon on August 3, 2007. It was announced in May 2008. Id Software CEO Todd Hollenshead suggested that like Doom II: Hell on Earth, the game would take place on Earth. Carmack stated that it would feature gameplay more akin to the original Doom games rather than the survival horror gameplay of Doom 3.

In 2008, Carmack claimed that Doom 4 would look "three times better" than Rage even though it was intended to run at 30 frames per second on Xbox 360 and PlayStation 3, rather than the 60 that Rage was targeting. It was planned to run at 60 frames per second on Windows with state-of-the-art hardware. Carmack also stated that the game was running on the id Tech 5 game engine. In 2009, he revealed that the multiplayer component was being developed separately and would run at 60 frames per second. He stated in 2011 that "you can't have 30 guys crawling all over you at 60 frames per second at this graphics technology level because it's painful."

In April 2009, Hollenshead said that Doom 4 was "deep in development". Asked whether Doom 4 would be a sequel, a reboot, or a prequel, his response was "It's not a sequel to Doom 3, but it's not a reboot either. Doom 3 was sort of a reboot. It's a little bit different than those." On June 23, 2009, ZeniMax Media, parent company of Bethesda Softworks, acquired id Software and announced that future id games would be published by Bethesda Softworks, including Doom 4. Id Software creative director Tim Willits announced that key releases would be much sooner and that the partnership allowed id Software to have two teams, each having a project in parallel development, for the first time. Carmack added that, once Rage was complete, its development team would move to Doom 4. Doom 4 might also feature dedicated servers unlike Rage.

At the 2011 QuakeCon, Carmack mentioned that the new Doom would be using a new scripting language based on C++ and called it "super-script", a superset of C++ with features such as scheduling and type safety. At the end of 2012, the team decided to make Doom 4 a reboot. In November 2013, Carmack left id Software to commit to his work at Oculus VR.

In April 2013, Kotaku published an exposé describing Doom 4 as trapped in "development hell". Citing connections to id, the article claimed that Doom 4 had suffered under mismanagement and that development was completely restarted in 2011. Inside sources described the pre-2011 version—which was to portray the uprising of Hell on Earth—as heavily scripted and cinematic, comparing it to the Call of Duty franchise. The pre-2011 version was criticized as mediocre and the new version as "lame" and a "mess". While Hollenshead initially stated that the Doom 4 team was doing something that fans would be happy with, id's Willits criticized the game's lack of character in QuakeCon 2013. In July 2015, Marty Stratton criticized Doom 4s lack of personality as id's primary reason to cancel the game, and pointed out its similarities to the Call of Duty franchise and that the game was not the product that id thought people wanted.

In a 2016 video documentary by Noclip, Doom creative director Hugo Martin described the "Hell on Earth" premise as: "It was like Robert Zemeckis. See Contact, like, if this really happened. Now let's be clear: it was awesome. But it was more realistic. It was about the global impact of a Hellish invasion." The creative director of the Doom 4 prototype, Kevin Cloud, said in the same interview, "As far as the upper-level creative direction, that was me driving that. And honestly, again, taking it in a direction I don't think the fans would have enjoyed."

As Doom
After the game's redesign began, Willits revealed in August 2013 that Doom was still the team's focus. British science fiction writer Graham Joyce was enlisted to write the game's story; after Joyce died in 2014, Adam Gascoine was brought in as a replacement. Sound designer Chad Mossholder was recruited to write flavor text, after the team found out he writes comics.

A teaser trailer of Doom was presented at E3 2014 and on the QuakeCon and Doom websites. A more expansive trailer was unveiled at QuakeCon 2014 on July 17, wherein a closed presentation was made mainly to silence ongoing rumors of the project being in jeopardy. Id Software executive producer Marty Stratton, the host of the presentation, announced that Doom 4 had been renamed Doom as "it’s an origin game, reimagining everything about the originals". In light of Crytek's financial difficulties, it was announced that Tiago Sousa, head R&D graphics engineer at Crytek, was leaving to join the Doom and id Tech 6 engine team as a lead programmer.

Bethesda released a teaser trailer to promote gameplay being shown at E3 2015 on June 14, 2015; the trailer depicted the double-barreled shotgun and the Revenant, a monster returning to the game. On June 14, around 15 minutes of gameplay footage were shown at E3. Regarding the progression system, Marty Stratton thought that it was important to allow players personalization and customization.

id felt the greatest challenge was to compete with other first-person shooters such as Call of Duty and Battlefield, as younger players were less familiar with the older Doom franchise. They also found it difficult to establish a game with its own identity while "being faithful" to other games in the series. The team consulted the game directors at Bethesda Game Studios, who Stratton considered "[had gone] through the same thing when they were working on Fallout 3."

On July 2, 2015, Stratton revealed that the game would not take place on Earth and that, unlike Doom 3, the game was comic and "very juvenile". Director Hugo Martin later said that the game was heavily inspired by rock and roll and He-Man and the Masters of the Universe and that its Hell-themed levels would feature much heavy metal. Dooms world was designed to have personality and be "over the top"; the UAC industrial field was designed to be the massive underbelly of the corporation, the UAC corporate field zone was designed to be much cleaner in terms of splattered goriness than the other zones to prevent repetition. Skulls were used in Hell as iconic elements and the Titan's Realm zone was constructed from dead, ancient, colossal demons. At QuakeCon 2015, it was announced that the game would run at 1080p and 60 frames per second on console, as id considered it "the most necessary graphical goal" which could effectively improve gameplay fluidity. According to Martin, the team put little emphasis on story, as they believed that it was not an important feature of the franchise. Instead, they added codex items to let interested players speculate about the story and the identity of the player character.

According to Stratton and Martin, movement is the game's most important pillar. To help keep movement fast, weapon reloading was excluded and levels were designed to discourage players from hiding. On January 25, Stratton confirmed the game's feature of nonlinear exploration and stated that combat is the game's focus and that the difficulty of the game was raised with the aim of creating an ultimate first-person shooter. On March 31, 2016, the release date of the Doom beta, a cinematic trailer directed by Joe Kosinski was created to evoke the game's three core pillars: incessant combat, terrifying demons, and powerful guns.

Dooms multiplayer was developed in conjunction with Certain Affinity. SnapMap was developed in conjunction with Escalation Studios and designed to be powerful, to give players the opportunity to create their own content as part of the Doom and id legacies, and target those who have no experience or expertise in traditional modding.

Soundtrack
The Doom soundtrack was composed by Mick Gordon, with additional contributions by Richard Devine. Gordon aimed to treat the game's original soundtrack with "utmost respect" while modernizing it; however, the team at id stipulated in the initial brief that they wanted "no guitars" on the soundtrack, fearing that it would make the game "feel like Bill & Ted" and that heavy metal music itself has become "a bit of a joke". Gordon's initial concept was based around the idea of Argent energy corrupting human-made devices; to mirror this in music, he fed basic waveforms – sine waves and white noise – through a complex array of effects units such as distortion and compression. While this resulted in a unique electronic sound, the game still was not "sounding like Doom"; Gordon then gradually started adding more and more guitar elements, which eventually resulted in the desired tone and feel for the game; Gordon used seven- and eight-string guitars to give the music a lower tone, and used a nine-string guitar for the game's main theme, a variation on Bobby Prince's "E1M1" / "At DOOM's Gate" theme; Gordon would eventually admit that using a nine-string was "kinda stupid" in its excess, and that while he eventually sold the guitar to Fredrik Thordendal from Meshuggah, "even he can't find a use for it". The soundtrack contains numerous easter eggs: some songs reference themes or sounds from older Doom games, others contain backmasking ("Jesus loves you"), images of pentagrams and the number 666 embedded into the sound via steganography. Gordon intended these as a joke, and never thought anyone would find them, but they were discovered shortly after release and widely covered in the media.

The soundtrack was widely praised and won the Best Music / Sound Design award at The Game Awards 2016; Gordon, joined by Periphery drummer Matt Halpern and Quake II composer Sascha Dikiciyan (aka Sonic Mayhem), performed a short medley of the soundtracks "Rip and Tear" and "BFG Division" as well as Quake IIs "Descent Into Cerberon" live at the awards show. The soundtrack was released in September 2016. It contains 31 tracks from the game, over 2 hours of music.

Release and marketing

On February 19, 2014, Bethesda revealed that access to a beta version of Doom 4, titled Doom, would be available for those who pre-ordered Wolfenstein: The New Order on any of the supportable platforms. Those players were also eligible for selection to participate in the game's multiplayer-only limited alpha, which ran between December 3 and 6, 2015. The beta began on March 31, 2016, and ended on April 3. It was followed by an open beta, which started on April 15, 2016, and ended on April 17. Doom was released for PlayStation 4, Windows, and Xbox One on May 13, 2016, worldwide; an exception was Japan, where it was released on May 19. It is also the first game of the Doom franchise to be released as uncensored in Germany. Bethesda partnered with Arrow Schmidt Peterson Motorsports for a special promotion that had Mikhail Aleshin driving a Doom-styled car at the Indianapolis 500 racing competition.

On February 23, 2016, Doom was made available for Xbox One owners to pre-order; for a limited time, they would also get the two original games, Doom and Doom II, for free. Other bonuses included the Demon Multiplayer Pack, which offered a demon-themed armor set with three skin variations; six metallic paint colors and three id Software logo patterns used for character customization; and six sets of consumable Hack Module perks. There is also a Collector's Edition, which was significantly more expensive than the normal edition. It includes a figurine of the Revenant – a demon featured in the game – and a metal case.

id Software replaced Certain Affinity to work on the multiplayer for Windows after the game's launch and promised to fix its issues and introduced new features such as private matches, custom game settings and an enhanced cheat detection system. At E3 2016 on June 12, Bethesda Softworks announced its division, Bethesda VR, and that it was working on virtual reality support for the newly-released Doom, set for release on an unspecified date. Also at E3 2016 on that day, Bethesda Softworks and id Software announced the game's free demo, which was initially going to last for only a week but was extended indefinitely. They also announced new multiplayer downloadable content titled Unto the Evil, whose features include three maps and a new demon called the "Harvester", guns, equipment item, taunts, and armor sets. The DLC was released on August 4, 2016. Patches for Doom were released after the game's release; these patches introduced a new photo mode, classic weapon pose, and support for the Vulkan API. The Vulkan patch was expected to enable playable frame rates on older hardware. Subsequent benchmarks show up to a 66% improvement in the frame rates on AMD graphics cards, with minor changes in the performance of Nvidia cards.

On July 19, 2017, an update was released which unlocked the game's premium multiplayer DLCs to all owners, while also revamping the progression system.

On September 13, 2017, it was announced via Nintendo Direct that Doom would release on Nintendo Switch during the fourth quarter of 2017. The retail Switch version differs from the other console versions in that the multiplayer component is not included in the base product, but is instead offered as a free download, whereas the SnapMap component is not included at all, both changes as a result of cartridge limitations. It was released on November 10, 2017. An update to the Switch version in February 2018 introduced the option to use the motion controls of the Joy-Con for aiming, similar to other Switch games such as Splatoon 2 and The Legend of Zelda: Breath of the Wild.

Months after Doom was released, Zen Studios developed a virtual pinball adaptation of the game as part of the Bethesda Pinball collection, which became available as part of Zen Pinball 2, Pinball FX 2 and Pinball FX 3,  as well as a separate free-to-play app for iOS and Android mobile devices. At E3 2017 Bethesda announced Doom VFR, a virtual reality adaptation of Doom, compatible with the PlayStation VR and HTC Vive headsets. In Doom VFR the player assumes the role of Mars' last survivor who, after being killed, gets his consciousness uploaded into an artificial network, and is tasked with defeating the demons and restoring the facility's operations, having an array of electronic devices and weapons at his disposal. The game was released on December 1, 2017.

Reception

Pre-release
Initial reception of the QuakeCon 2014 trailer accumulated considerable acclaim among fans, and initial reception of the E3 2015 trailer was also positive, despite receiving criticisms by some critics, who considered the game to be too violent. Pete Hines from Bethesda Softworks responded by saying that the game is designed to allow players to apply violence on demons instead of humans. Hines added that, "if you're not into violent, bloody games... Doom probably not a game for you."

During the open multiplayer beta, IGN writer Nathan Lawrence called the beta disappointing, considering it less of a classic style "arena shooter" and unfavorable compared to other shooters such as Halo. Similarly, the beta was negatively received by players on Steam, with mostly negative reviews at the time when the beta was active. Rock, Paper, Shotgun writer Adam Smith found the beta both to be similar to games such as Quake 3, Unreal Tournament, and the Call of Duty series and not to feel like Doom itself, and criticized the weapon loadout concept. Review copies of the game were held back until release day.

Post-release

Doom was released to positive reception regarding the fast-paced gameplay, single-player campaign, visuals and soundtrack whereas criticism was predominantly toward the multiplayer mode. Many critics believed that Doom was a successful return to form for the series. Following the wide release, the game received scores of 85/100 for PC and PlayStation 4 and 87/100 for the Xbox One on Metacritic. The Nintendo Switch edition, released in November 2017, was also positively received by professional reviewers, garnering a 79/100 on Metacritic: most reviewers praised the job of the port, also conceding that it was not as well optimized as it was for previous consoles. The final version of the game received very positive reviews from users on Steam. It also received praise from other video game creators, including Cliff Bleszinski and Greg Kasavin, who said that the game answers questions that other modern shooters do not answer.

The game's single-player elements received critical acclaim. Alec Meer of Rock, Paper, Shotgun favorably compared Doom to the 2014 game Wolfenstein: The New Order, also published by Bethesda, but added that Dooms quality surpassed that of Wolfenstein due to its fast pace and solid gunplay. Peter Brown of GameSpot praised single-player because he thought that the reboot captured the spirits of the older games, while refining them with modern elements. Brown also drew attention toward the soundtrack, calling it "impactful". Mike Henriquez of Game Revolution favored the visual and artistic design, calling it "top-notch". Sam White in The Daily Telegraph commended id Software for Dooms delivery of performance on all platforms and praised the weapon design for Dooms continuity to introduce new weapons at a perfect speed so that gamers always play with something new and exciting.

Polygon's Arthur Gies remarked positively upon the exploration for collectables and secrets, and their relevance to the new upgrade feature, but he was critical of instances where the game would lock away sections of a level without warning. Zack Furniss of Destructoid was originally skeptical regarding the "glory kills" feature, as were other critics, fearing that they might distract from the fast-paced gameplay. He ultimately considered them to fit well in the flow of gameplay that keeps players in the middle of combat without a slowed pace. Giant Bombs Brad Shoemaker felt that the glory kills' generating small amounts of health and armor "makes them an essential part of the give-and-take of Dooms super fast combat; do you dart into the fray for a glory kill to get a little health back, and risk getting mobbed by all the other enemies around?" Conversely, Kyle Orland of Ars Technica felt that the glory kills' briefly taking control away from the player can easily disorient players or misposition them, finding them hard to ignore for players that choose not to use them.

The SnapMap mode was also positively received with Hardcore Gamer Jordan Helm's noting the possibilities yet simplicity with its use, calling it an "admirable feat". Matt Peckham of Time thought that the mode added further value to the overall package of the game. Matt Bertz of Game Informer commented upon the accessibility but criticized the lack of diverse settings and possible limitations when compared to a traditional community-based mod. James Davenport of PC Gamer compared it to the modification in the original games, which he views as one of the primary reasons why Doom is still a recognizable title. He was disappointed by the lack of mod support, though he nevertheless noted SnapMap for its simple use and variety of ideas already created by players.

The multiplayer mode, however, garnered a mixed reception from critics. IGN's Joab Gilory was less favorable toward the multiplayer, calling the overall game "a tale of two very different shooters", stating that multiplayer did not live up to the standard set by the single-player components and would not satisfy players. Simon Miller of VideoGamer.com found the multiplayer to be only alright. Matt Buchholtz of EGM criticized what he felt was the network's poor handling of latency, and failing to register on-target shots as hits in some instances while not in others. Edwin Evans-Thirlwell of Eurogamer singled out the "Warpath" multiplayer mode as the most interesting of the match type, describing it as "memorable", while he regarded the other multiplayer modes as underdeveloped and underwhelming. Julian Benson from Kotaku wrote that Dooms multiplayer was very similar to other modern games. More positively, however, David Houghton of GamesRadar enjoyed the multiplayer for the fast pace yet quick decision-making needed to succeed, calling it "endlessly playable, smart, brutal fun." Doom was placed 1st in the GamesRadar's list of top FPS games of all time.

Sales
It was the second best-selling retail game in its week of release in the UK, behind Uncharted 4: A Thief's End. This was reported to be 67% more in its first week than the previous entry, Doom 3. Doom was the second best-selling retail video game in the US in May 2016, also behind Uncharted 4. By the end of May 2016, Dooms sales on the PC reached 500,000 copies. The following month, by late June 2016, the game rose to number one in the UK charts, overtaking Uncharted 4 and the later-released Overwatch, and remained number one for a second week. The game had surpassed one million sold copies for PCs in August 2016. By July 2017, the game reached two million copies sold on PC. In November 2017 Doom was the fourth best-selling Switch game, during its debut week.

Accolades
Doom was featured in multiple lists by critics and media outlets as one of the best games of 2016, being featured in game of the year lists and articles including Giant Bomb, GameSpot, GamesRadar, The Escapist, The A.V. Club, Rock, Paper, Shotgun, Jim Sterling, VG247, Daily Mirror, Zero Punctuation and Shacknews.

Sequel 

At the E3 2018 press conference in June, Bethesda Softworks announced a sequel titled Doom Eternal; gameplay footage was showcased at Quakecon 2018. It is based on id Tech 7 and was released on March 20, 2020.

Notes

References

External links 
 

2016 video games
Bethesda Softworks games
Video games about demons
Doom (franchise) games
First-person shooters
Id Software games
Id Tech games
Multiplayer and single-player video games
Multiplayer online games
Nintendo Switch games
Permadeath games
PlayStation 4 games
PlayStation 4 Pro enhanced games
Science fantasy video games
Stadia games
Video game reboots
Video games developed in the United States
Video games scored by Mick Gordon
Video games set in the 22nd century
Video games set on Mars
Video games set in hell
Fiction set in the 2140s
Video games with downloadable content
Video games with user-generated gameplay content
Windows games
Xbox One games
Xbox One X enhanced games
The Game Awards winners
Certain Affinity games